Coelotes alpinus is a funnel-web spider species found in Italy, Austria and Slovenia.

See also 
 List of Agelenidae species

References

External links 

Agelenidae
Spiders of Europe
Spiders described in 1972